Christian Core (born 5 October 1974) is an Italian professional sport climber and bouldering climber. He is known for being the first-ever person in the world to climb an  boulder, Gioia in 2008. He won the Bouldering World Cup twice, in 1999 and 2002, and a Bouldering World Championship in 2003.

Climbing career
In 1999 Core stopped competing in the Lead Climbing World Cup and started participating in the Bouldering World Cup, organized by UIAA in that year for the first time in history. He immediately won the Cup, and again in 2002.  In 2003, he earned the title of World Champion in bouldering.

He had ascended several very hard boulders in Italy near Bobbio Pellice, Varazze and Triora. In 2008, he climbed Gioia, the first-ever boulder graded  in history, and was for 8 years, the most difficult boulder in the world. In 2011, Adam Ondra repeated the ascent and confirmed the grade, however, in 2015, Core announced that someone had chipped new holds into Gioia, which he could only partially repair, and which slightly lowered the grade.

Personal life
In 2009, he married the climber Stella Marchisio.

Rankings 

Climbing World Cup

Climbing World Championships

Climbing European Championships

Number of medals in the Climbing World Cup 
Bouldering

Rock climbing

Redpointed routes 
Core redpointed  and onsighted  routes.

Boulder problems 
Core redpointed  and flashed  boulder problems.

8C+/V16:
 Gioia – Varazze (ITA) – 2008 – First ascent. Adam Ondra repeated it on 6 December 2011 and confirmed the 8C+ grade. Third ascent by Nalle Hukkataival

8C/V15:
 Kimera – Rifugio Barbara (Bobbio Pellice, ITA) – 2006 – First ascent

8B+/V14:
 Toky – Val Ellero (ITA) – 2009 – First ascent
 New Base Line – Magic Wood (CHE) – 2006
 Beautiful mind – Albarracin (ESP) – 2006 – First ascent
 Ajna – Varazze (ITA) – 2004 – First ascent
 Toguro – Varazze (ITA) – 2003 – First ascent
 Dreamtime – Cresciano (CHE) – 2003 – Fifth ascent (first ascent by Fred Nicole)
 Taklimakam plus – Varazze (ITA) – 2002 – First ascent
 Shadowfax – Chironico (CHE) – 2002 – Third ascent (first ascent by Dave Graham)

Film 
 i Core, my climbing family – 2012 – Regia di Angelo Poli – 45'

See also 
List of grade milestones in rock climbing
History of rock climbing
Rankings of most career IFSC gold medals

References

Bibliografia

External links 
 

1974 births
Living people
Italian rock climbers
Climbers of Fiamme Oro
IFSC Climbing World Championships medalists
IFSC Climbing World Cup overall medalists
Boulder climbers